The 1972 Soviet First League was the second season of the Soviet First League and the 32nd season of the Soviet second tier league competition.

Final standings

Number of teams by union republic

External links
 1972 season. RSSSF

1972
2
Soviet
Soviet